William Broadbent  may refer to:

William Broadbent (1825–1907), English neurologist
William Broadbent (minister) (1755–1827), English Unitarian minister
William Broadbent, 3rd Baronet (1904–1987), of the Broadbent baronets

See also
William Broadbent Luddington (1843–1888), English Primitive Methodist missionary
Broadbent